Baffle West is a rural locality in the Maranoa Region, Queensland, Australia.

Geography 
Baffle Creek flows from the north-west of the locality (Westgrove) to the north-east of the locality (Beilba) where it becomes a tributary of the Dawson River.

The Carnarvon Highway traverses the locality from north (Upper Dawson) to east (Beilba) and forms the locality's south-eastern boundary.

The Doonkuna State Forest occupies  in the south of the locality.

History 

Education 
There are no schools in Baffle West. The nearest government primary school and secondary school (to Year 10) is Injune State School in Injune to the south. There are no schools offering secondary education to Year 12 with daily commuting distance; options are distance education and boarding school.

References 

Maranoa Region
Localities in Queensland